Getz/Gilberto #2 is a live album by Stan Getz and João Gilberto, released in 1966. It was recorded at a live concert at Carnegie Hall in October 1964. The previous album Getz/Gilberto won the 1965 Grammy Awards for Best Album of the Year and Best Jazz Instrumental Album - Individual or Group amongst others.  The painting on the cover is by Olga Albizu.

Track listing
 "Grandfather's Waltz" (Lasse Farnlof, Gene Lees)  – 4:58
 "Tonight I Shall Sleep (With a Smile on My Face)" (Duke Ellington, Irving Gordon)  – 2:46
 "Stan's Blues" (Gigi Gryce)  – 4:46
 "Here's That Rainy Day" (Johnny Burke, Jimmy Van Heusen)  – 4:02
 "Samba da Minha Terra" (Dorival Caymmi)  – 3:09
 "Rosa Morena" (Dorival Caymmi)  – 4:05
 "Um Abraço No Bonfá" (João Gilberto)  – 2:51
 "Bim Bom" (João Gilberto)  – 2:10
 "Meditation" (Norman Gimbel, Antonio Carlos Jobim, Newton Mendonça)  – 3:56
 "O Pato (The Duck)" (Jon Hendricks, Jayme Silva, Neuza Teixeira)  – 2:22
 "It Might as Well Be Spring" (Oscar Hammerstein II, Richard Rodgers)  – 5:53
 "Only Trust Your Heart" (Sammy Cahn, Benny Carter)  – 5:50
 "Corcovado" (Antonio Carlos Jobim, Lees)  – 5:40
 "Garota de Ipanema (The Girl from Ipanema)" (Vinicius de Moraes, Norman Gimbel, Antonio Carlos Jobim)  – 7:39
 "Você e Eu" (Vinicius de Moraes, Carlos Lyra)  – 3:28

Tracks 11 to 15 not included on the original LP.
Some editions incorrectly credit "Samba da Minha Terra" and "Rosa Morena" to Danilo Caymmi.

Personnel 
Tracks 1-4
Stan Getz - tenor sax
Gary Burton - vibraphone
Gene Cherico - bass
Joe Hunt - drums

Tracks 5-10
João Gilberto - guitar, vocal
Keter Betts - bass
Helcio Milito - drums

Tracks 11-15
Stan Getz - tenor sax
João Gilberto - guitar, vocal
Astrud Gilberto - vocal
Gary Burton - vibraphone
Gene Cherico - bass
Joe Hunt - drums

References 

Live bossa nova albums
João Gilberto live albums
Stan Getz live albums
Albums produced by Creed Taylor
1966 live albums
Verve Records live albums
Albums recorded at Carnegie Hall